Advanced Optical Materials is a monthly peer-reviewed scientific journal published by Wiley-VCH. It was established in 2013, after a section with the same name had been published since March 2012 in Advanced Materials. It covers all aspects of light-matter interactions. The founding editor-in-chief is Peter Gregory.

Abstracting and indexing
The journal is abstracted and indexed in:

According to the Journal Citation Reports, the journal has a 2021 impact factor of 10.050, ranking it 52nd out of 345 journals in the category "Materials Science, Multidisciplinary" and 9th out of 101 journals in the category "Optics".

References

External links

Materials science journals
Optics journals
Publications established in 2013
English-language journals
Monthly journals
Wiley-VCH academic journals